Vasisht may refer to:

Akash Vasisht, Indian cricket player
Shanta Vasisht, Indan politician
Vashistha, Indian Vedic sage